Guardianship is an outdoor 1935 sculpture by American artist James Earle Fraser, installed in front of the National Archives Building in Washington, D.C., United States. Guardianship is a companion piece to Heritage.

See also
 1935 in art
 List of public art in Washington, D.C., Ward 6

External links
 

1935 establishments in Washington, D.C.
1935 sculptures
Outdoor sculptures in Washington, D.C.
Sculptures of men in Washington, D.C.
Statues in Washington, D.C.
Works by James Earle Fraser (sculptor)
Federal Triangle